Fremont City Schools is a public school district serving students in the city of Fremont, Ohio, United States. The school district enrolls 3,519 students as of the 2019-2020 academic year.

Schools

High schools

Fremont Ross High School (Grades 9th through 12th)
Located at 1100 North St. Fremont, Ohio 43420

Middle schools

Fremont Middle School (Grades 6th, 7th and 8th)
Located at 1250 North St. Fremont, Ohio 43420

Elementary schools
Atkinson Elementary School (Grades K through 5th) 
Located at 1100 Delaware Ave. Fremont, Ohio 43420
Croghan Elementary School (Grades K through 5th)
Located at 414 N. Pennsylvania Ave. Fremont, Ohio 43420
Lutz Elementary School (Grades K through 5th)
Located at 1929 Buckland Ave. Fremont, Ohio 43420
Otis Elementary School (Grades K through 5th)
Located at 718 North Brush St. Fremont, Ohio

Administrative office
Located at 500 W. State St., Suite A, Fremont, Ohio 43420

References

External links
Fremont City School District website

Education in Sandusky County, Ohio
Fremont, Ohio
School districts in Ohio